Peter Ducke (born 14 October 1941) is a Sudeten German and a former East German football player. He was born in Bensen, Sudetenland, Germany during World War II.  His older brother Roland was also a successful footballer.

Ducke played most of his career for FC Carl Zeiss Jena (1959–1977). On the national level he played for East Germany national team in 63 matches (15 goals), and was a participant at the 1974 FIFA World Cup.

Early life
Peter Ducke and his brother Roland were both born in Bensen but Roland was born there in 1934, while it was part of Czechoslovakia, but Peter was born there while it was part of Sudetenland, Germany during World War II. Their hometown is now, however, known as Benešov nad Ploučnicí, Czech Republic. After the Second World War Ducke's family left their home in Sudetenland to settle in Schönebeck near Magdeburg, Germany.

Following both his father and his three brothers into football Ducke began his career in 1950 for a Betriebssportgemeinschaft Motor Schönebeck whose first men's team played in the Saxony-Anhalt league.
 
In 1955, his older brother Roland went to play for DDR-Oberliga in the FC Carl Zeiss Jena league and later was able to take his 16-year-old brother Peter with him. Ducke failed to impress the team during training camp and was sent home.

DDR-Oberliga 

Only after convincing performances in five international matches with the East German youth team from 1959 to 1960 Jena was interested in Ducke again. He moved to SC Motor Jena for the start of the 1959 season.  In just his second season in the league he was achieving success. On 7 October 1960, he took his team to a 3–2 victory over F.C. Hansa Rostock win the FDGB-Pokal. With his two goals he was instrumental in his team's success. With that cup victory Jena laid the foundation for a successful era which lasted over 20 years.

In Duckes' career with Jena, and later as FC Carl Zeiss Jena, he was a three time East German champion and cup winner. As a center forward on the team Ducke, within 18 years, scored 153 goals which was a significant contribution to their success. He ranks third in scoring for the East German Oberliga.

From 1960 to 1964 and again in 1969 Ducke was the top goal scorer for Jena and in 1963 he was top scorer in the league with 19 goals. This led the league coaches, in a survey by the newspaper Deutsches Sportecho, to nominate Ducke as the best striker of the 1962/63 season.  His league career would have been more successful had it not been for serious leg injuries in 1966 and a meniscus injury in 1974.

A ten-week suspension for his outburst during the 1–2 loss to SC Magdeburg during the 1965 Cup Final contributed to the fact that Ducke, with 352 league games, only ranks in twelfth place on the list of Oberliga games played. Otherwise he could have made it to the top 10. His emotional temperament brought a large number of game ejections and match suspensions.

Despite his skill, his spectacular play and despite being a fan favorite in the GDR he was given the nickname Schwarzer Peter. In 1965 he was an athlete of the year award, in 1971 as a footballer of the year. He ended his Oberliga career at the conclusion of the 1976–77 season.

References

Further reading

External links
 
 
 
 
 

1941 births
Living people
People from Benešov nad Ploučnicí
People from Sudetenland
Sudeten German people
German footballers
East German footballers
1974 FIFA World Cup players
Footballers at the 1972 Summer Olympics
Olympic footballers of East Germany
Olympic bronze medalists for East Germany
FC Carl Zeiss Jena players
East Germany international footballers
Olympic medalists in football
DDR-Oberliga players
Medalists at the 1972 Summer Olympics
Association football forwards